The 2008 Paul Hunter Classic was a pro–am snooker tournament held in August 2008. Barry Pinches was the reigning champion, but he was eliminated in the last 32 by Shaun Murphy. Murphy went on to win the tournament, defeating Mark Selby 4–0 in the final.



Tournament structure
The initial stage began with 40 groups of 4 players. The winners of each group advanced to the last 32 stage of the tournament, and the tournament runners-up moved to the last 64. Shaun Murphy was the only professional not to top his group, and thus had to play two matches more than the other professional players.

Main draw

References

Paul Hunter Classic
2008 in snooker
2008 in German sport
August 2008 sports events in Europe